Kolla is a surname. Notable people with the surname include:

 Ilmi Kolla (1933–1954), Estonian poet
 Kathy Kolla, American director, screenwriter, and actress
 Patrick Michael Kolla, German software engineer